Suryanarayana Temple is a Sun temple situated in Gollala Mamidada village of Pedapudi Mandal, Kakinada district of Andhra Pradesh, India. The temple was founded in 1920 by Sri Kovvuri Basivi Reddy, the zamindar of Gollala Mamidada, near the Antharvahini river amongst 16 acres of grass fields and coconut palms. Some of the rites and festivals performed include Archanas, Abhishekams, Ratha Saptami, and Ekadasi.

References

Hindu temples in Kakinada district
1920 establishments in India
Religious buildings and structures completed in 1920
Surya temples
20th-century Hindu temples
20th-century architecture in India